Dala may refer to:

Places
Dala Airport, Dalarna province, Sweden
Dala, Angola
Dala, Bhutan
Dala, Kano, Nigeria
Dalla Hill, a hill in Kano, Nigeria
Đala, Serbia
Dalas, Khuzestan Province, Iran
Dala Township, Yangon, Myanmar

People
 Binnya Dala (disambiguation), several people
 Jacinto  Dala (born 1996), Angolan footballer
 Junior Dala (born 1989), South African cricketer
 Nanyak Dala (born 1984), Canadian rugby union player
 Peter Dala, Canadian conductor

Other uses
Dala (band), a Canadian music duo
Dala (game), a board game from Sudan
Dala horse, traditional Swedish wooden horse statuettes
Dala-fur sheep, a Swedish breed of sheep
The Hawaiian dollar, which was in circulation between 1847 and 1898
Dala Line, a single-track railway line in Sweden

See also
Betpak-Dala, a region in Kazakhstan
Dala-Floda, Dalarna County, Sweden
Dala dala, minibus share taxis in Tanzania
Hagryd-Dala, Halland County, Sweden